When Ponds Freeze Over is a Canadian short film, directed by Mary Lewis and released in 1998.

Mixing live action with animation, the film stars Lewis herself as Mary, a woman recounting to her daughter Eva (Eva Crocker) the childhood story of when Mary and her father (James Allodi) fell through the ice on a frozen pond.

The animated segments were created by Lewis, Peter Evans, Shelley Cornick and Lisa Moore.

Accolades
The film won the Toronto International Film Festival Award for Best Canadian Short Film at the 1998 Toronto International Film Festival, and the Genie Award for Best Live Action Short Drama at the 19th Genie Awards.

References

External links
 

1998 films
1998 drama films
Best Live Action Short Drama Genie and Canadian Screen Award winners
1998 short films
1990s English-language films
Canadian drama short films
1990s Canadian films